Paul Leyland (St. Helens) and is an English former professional rugby league footballer who was a professional with St. Helens in the Super League and formerly played in their reserve side. He attended Broadway High School, and signed for St Helens from local amateur side Portico Vine ARLFC. He made his first-team début in the 2006's Super League XI when Saints played a mostly reserve team against Catalans Dragons in preparation for their upcoming Challenge Cup Final. He now coaches the under-20s as an assistant to Ian Talbot.

References

External links
Saints Heritage Society profile

1986 births
Living people
English rugby league players
Rugby league centres
Rugby league locks
Rugby league props
St Helens R.F.C. players